Notomegabalanus is a genus of acorn barnacles in the family Balanidae. There are about 12 described species in Notomegabalanus.

Species
These species belong to the genus Notomegabalanus:

 Notomegabalanus algicola Pilsbry, 1916 (white dwarf barnacle)
 Notomegabalanus buckeridgei Carriol, 2002
 Notomegabalanus campbelli (Filhol, 1885)
 Notomegabalanus concinnus (Darwin, 1854)
 Notomegabalanus decorus (Darwin, 1854) (pink barnacle)
 Notomegabalanus insperatus Zullo & Guruswami-Naidu, 1982
 Notomegabalanus krakatauensis (Nilsson-Cantell, 1934)
 Notomegabalanus lepidus Zullo, 1986
 Notomegabalanus miodecorus Buckeridge, 1983
 Notomegabalanus obliquus (Ross, 1964)
 Notomegabalanus squillae (Daniel & Ghosh, 1963)
 Notomegabalanus wilsoni (Zullo, 1969)

References

External links

 

Barnacles